Hôpital Universitaire de Mirebalais is a hospital in Mirebalais that was created by Partners In Health after the 2010 Haiti earthquake. It features solar power that can provide complete power on sunny days and feed power back to the grid. It is the largest solar-operated hospital in the world.

Notes

Hospitals in Haiti
Hospitals established in 2013